The Lithuanian Figure Skating Championships are an annual national competition held to crown the national champions of Lithuania. Skaters compete in the disciplines of men's singles, ladies' singles, pair skating, and ice dancing, across different levels. Some categories are not held in every year due to a lack of entries. The Championships are organized by the Lithuanian Skating Federation, except in the 2016–17 season, when a combined Lithuanian-Latvian event was organized. The results were then separated to form national podiums.

Senior medalists

Men

Ladies

Pairs

Ice dancing

Junior medalists

Men

Ladies

Advanced novice medalists

Boys

Girls

References

External links
 interwiki Russian

Figure skating in Lithuania
Figure skating national championships